Daisy Systems is a computer-aided engineering company.

Daisy Systems is also the name of:

Daisy Systems GmbH, a German subsidiary of Daisy Systems
Daisy Systems Holland, a Dutch printer company